The Rupashi Bangla Express is a Superfast train belonging to South Eastern Railway zone that runs between  and  in India. It is currently being operated with 12883/12884 train numbers on a daily basis.

Service

The 12883/Rupashi Bangla Express has an average speed of 60 km/hr and covers 325 km in 5h 25m. The 12884/Rupashi Bangla Express has an average speed of 57 km/hr and covers 325 km in 5h 40m. Currently there is talk within the Railways that the trains route would be changed .( Source : Locals of Purulia)

Route and halts 

The important halts of the train are:

Coach composition

The train has LHB rakes with max speed of 130  kmph. The train consists of 14 coaches :

 2 AC Chair Car
 6 Second Sitting
 4 General Unreserved
 1 Seating cum Luggage Rake
 1 EOG

Traction

Both trains are hauled by a Santragachi-based WAP-4 electric locomotives from Santragachi Junction to Purulia and Purulia to Howrah Junction.

See also 

 Santragachi Junction railway station
 Purulia Junction railway station
 Aranyak Express

Notes

References

External links 

 12883/Rupashi Bangla Express
 12884/Rupashi Bangla Express

Rail transport in Howrah
Express trains in India
Rail transport in West Bengal
Railway services introduced in 2000
Named passenger trains of India